Elimia gibbera was a species of freshwater snails with an operculum, aquatic gastropod mollusks in the family Pleuroceridae. This species was endemic to the United States. It is now extinct, the attributed cause is land-use change.

References 

gibbera
Extinct gastropods
Taxa named by Edwin Stephen Goodrich
Gastropods described in 1922
Taxonomy articles created by Polbot